Anchieta is a  municipality in the Brazilian state of Espírito Santo.

Formerly known as Reritiba, the city was renamed after the Jesuit Spanish missionary and saint José de Anchieta (1534-1597).

References

Municipalities in Espírito Santo
Populated coastal places in Espírito Santo